Nerkundram or Nerkunram is a census town located in Chennai City, Chennai district in the Indian state of Tamil Nadu. It falls under Maduravoyal (State Assembly Constituency) constituency in Tiruvallur district in the Indian state of Tamil Nadu. It consists of a portion of Ambattur taluk and part of Chennai Corporation. It falls under Sriperumbudur (Lok Sabha constituency).

Geography
It has an average elevation of 18 metres (59 feet).

Demographics
 India census, Nerkundram had a population of 39,544. Males constitute 52% of the population and females 48%. Nerkundram has an average literacy rate of 72%, higher than the national average of 59.5%; male literacy is 78%, and female literacy is 65%. In Nerkundram, 14% of the population is under 6 years of age.

Localities 
Now, Nerkundram is a part of Chennai Corporation. It belongs to 145, 146, 147, 148 circle in Chennai corporation. Previously Nerkundram was in the Suburban Panchayat near Chennai.

Ward 1
P.H. Road, People Flats, Pallavan Nagar, Nerkundram, Church St., Mandaveli St..

Ward 2
Valliammai Nagar, Selliyamman Nagar, Senthamizh Nagar, Santha Avenue, Agathiyar Nagar, Sakthi Nagar, RJR Nagar, Muthumariyamman Koil St, Sivasakthi Nagar, Kanniyamman Nagar, Nethaji Avenue, Azhagammal Nagar, Thamarai Avenue, Rajiv Gandhi Nagar, Krishna Nagar, Kothandaramar Nagar, Jayalakshmi Nagar, Moogambigai Nagar, Balakrishna Nagar, Dhanalakshmi Nagar, Thiramalai Nagar, Muniyappa Nagar, Annammal Nagar, Thiruvalluvar Colony, Saraswathi Colony, Janakiraman Colony.

Ward 3
Mettukuppam, Govarthana Nagar, Rajiv Nagar, Nesammal Nagar, Jayaram Nagar, Dhanalakshmi Nagar, Sri Kadambadi Amman Nagar, CDN Nagar, Ramalinga Nagar, Buvaneswari Nagar, Senthil Nagar, Balavinayagar Nagar, Sakthivel Nagar, Abirami Nagar, Vadavenniyamman Nagar.

Ward 4
Periyar Nagar, Sri Lakshmi Nagar, Balaji Nagar.

Ward 5
Saraswathi Nagar, Meenatchiyamman Nagar, Jaya Nursery and Primary School, Dhidilnagar, Nerkundram New Colony, Perumal Koil St., Madha koil street, Madha koil main road.

Schools, Colleges , Shops, Welfare clubs and Party office     
 Saraswathi Nagar Youth Club Association
 Missile Hero Kalam's welfare club
 Ravindra Bharathi Global School (CBSE)
 Dayasadan Agarwal Vidyalaya School (CBSE)
 Sri Devi Matriculation School
 Lbeaar Matriculation School
 Jain Joseph Nursery and Primary School
 Sri Sastha Matriculation School
 Thai Moogambigai Polytechnic College
 Maa school of hotel management
 Nathan Girls Higher Secondary SchooL
 Marys Nursery & Primary School
 Dr MGR University
 Canan School of Catering and Hotel Management
 Walkinweb NetCafe
 Sri Ragavendra Travels
 Amman Travels
 Saraswathi Nagar Welfare Association   
 Sai Tempo Auto Parts
 Jaya Nursery and Primary school
 St. Antony Nursery&Primary School
 St. Elisabeth Matriculation School
 M.R. Mtriculation school
 தமிழ்நாடு இளைஞர் கட்சி அலுவலகம், TN YOUTH PARTY OFFICE
 Chennai Express (shopping & delivery)

Areas Near Nerkundram
 Virugambakkam
 Maduravoyal
 Alwarthirunagar
 Koyambedu
 Saligrammam
 Vadapalani
 Valasaravakkam
 Alapakkam
 Mogappair
 Velappanchavadi
 Thiruverkadu
 Ayapakkam
 Ayanambakkam
 Kumananchavadi
 Karaiyanchavadi
 Ambattur

References

Cities and towns in Tiruvallur district
Neighbourhoods in Chennai